The Brocken Transmitter is a facility for FM- and TV-transmitters on  the Brocken, the highest mountain in northern Germany.

The facility includes two transmission towers. The old tower was built between 1936 and 1937.
It is 53 metres high (including its antenna mast, which no longer exists, it had a height of 95 metres) and has an observation deck, which can be reached by elevator. This tower was intended to be used after 1939 for TV transmissions to central Germany, but due to the beginning of World War II, it was transformed into a radar facility.
Unlike most modern TV towers, the old tower looks like a block of flats with a square cross section. The arrangement of the windows in the observation deck is similar to those in the restaurant in the Radio tower Berlin.

In 1973 a new TV tower was built on Brocken. This 123-meter, freestanding steel-tube tower stands on three legs,
which hold shafts for cable and stairways for personnel access.
Above the legs are three decks for directional radio transmission aerials. The new TV tower is not accessible to the public.

While Germany was divided into East and West, the Brocken transmitter was used for TV and FM-transmissions, even though it lay in the restricted area of the east-west frontier (on the Eastern Side). Its location so close to the border enabled it to be received in parts of the West.

In the first half of the 1990s the transmitting aerial of the old tower was removed and replaced by a radome holding air traffic control radar equipment.

The Brocken Transmitter is property of Deutsche Telekom.

Signals transmitted from Brocken

Analogue television
ARD (originally DFF1), VHF channel E6 (Horizontal) 100 kW
ZDF, UHF channel 49 500 kW
MDR 3rd Programme (originally DFF2), UHF channel 34 (Horizontal) 1000 kW

FM radio
MDR 1 Radio Sachsen-Anhalt,  94.6 MHz (60 kW) 
MDR Jump,  91.5 MHz (100 kW)
MDR Figaro,  107.8 MHz (10 kW)
Deutschlandradio Kultur, 97.4 MHz (100 kW)
89.0 RTL, 89.0 MHz (60 kW)
Radio SAW, 101.4 MHz (100 kW)

See also
 List of Towers

External links
 
 
http://www.skyscraperpage.com/diagrams/?b2085
http://www.skyscraperpage.com/diagrams/?b41976

Radio masts and towers in Germany
Observation towers
1937 establishments in Germany
Towers completed in 1937